David Schweitzer (18 July 1925 – 17 August 1997) was an Israeli football player and manager who was active at both professional and international levels.

Career

Playing career
Schweitzer started his athletic career as a basketball player with Hapoel Tel Aviv, before switching to football. During his time with Hapoel Haifa, Schweitzer took coaching courses and served as the youth team coach, and transferred to Hapoel Kiryat Haim, where he acted as player-coach.

Schweitzer made six appearances for the Israeli national team between 1949 and 1954.

Coaching career
Schweitzer managed the Israeli national team between 1973 and 1977.

References

External links
 
 
 

1925 births
1997 deaths
Israeli footballers
Israel international footballers
Israeli football managers
Israel national football team managers
Footballers from Tel Aviv
Hapoel Tel Aviv F.C. players
Hapoel Haifa F.C. players
Association football midfielders
Hapoel Tel Aviv F.C. managers